New Mexico State Road 6 (NM 6) is an east–west state highway in the state of New Mexico. NM 6's western terminus is at Interstate 40 (I-40) west of Albuquerque, and the eastern terminus is at NM 47 in Los Lunas.

Route description

The road travels to the southeast and then to the east. It has an interchange with I-25 in Los Lunas. The road passes through the village of Los Lunas as Main Street, crossing the Rio Grande before its eastern terminus at NM 47. Some maps show NM 6 continuing south concurrently with NM 47 through Belen and onward to U.S. Route 60 (US 60). This alignment is not reflected in the state highway log.

History

Much of NM 6 follows the historic alignment of US 66 and is signed as such.

Major intersections

See also

References

External links

006
Transportation in Cibola County, New Mexico
Transportation in Valencia County, New Mexico
U.S. Route 66 in New Mexico